Canine cancer detection is an approach to cancer screening that relies upon the claimed olfactory ability of dogs to detect, in urine or in breath, very low concentrations of the alkanes and aromatic compounds generated by malignant tumors. While some research has been promising, no verified studies by secondary research groups have substantiated the validity of positive, conclusive results.

Background

Media coverage
The proposal that dogs can detect cancer attracted widespread coverage in the general media.
In 2015 the Huffington Post reported that studies have suggested that dogs may be able to detect lung cancer, melanoma,  breast cancer and bladder cancer, and that dogs can be trained to detect cancer in 93% of cases.  In 2016, actress Shannen Doherty told Entertainment Tonight in an interview that her dog identified her breast cancer before  doctors could diagnose it.  National Geographic said that "man's best friend can detect various cancers, including prostate cancer, colorectal cancer and melanoma."

On the other hand, a review by Australian Popular Science found that the more rigorous trials produced less positive results.  Another trial reported in Nature World News found disappointing results, but nevertheless "the researchers... believe that one day, dogs can still detect lung cancer."

NBC reported that Britain's National Health Service is behind the first clinical trial to test the ability of canines to  detect cancer.

Research
Although the first suggestion of this approach in a medical journal, The Lancet, dates back to 1989, there were only occasional publications on the subject in the next decade.

However, two studies (one published in 2004 and one in 2006), involving detection in urine, had promising results, with the 2006 report claiming a 99% accuracy in detecting lung cancer, although both studies were preliminary and involved small numbers of patients.

In a 2011 study, lung cancer was identified with a sensitivity of 71% and a specificity of 93%, using breath samples.

Skeptical analysis
In a May 25, 2012 article, “What to make of Medical Dogs” published by Science-Based Medicine, Peter Lipson reported on his review of the scientific literature regarding these claims and found valid support for positive conclusions to be lacking:

See also
 Scent hound

References

Olfaction
Working dogs
Oncology
Cancer screening
Alternative medical diagnostic methods